Panagrolaimidae is a family of nematodes belonging to the order Rhabditida.

Genera:
 Anguilluloides Ruhm, 1956
 Baldwinema Atighi, Pourjam, Bert, Pedram, Ghaemi & Panahandeh, 2016
 Baujardia Bert, De Ley, Segers, Van Driessche & De Ley, 2003
 Halicephalobus Timm, 1956
 Indocephalobus Mondal & Manna, 2014
 Macrolaimus Maupas, 1900
 Micronema Körner, 1954
 Mukhina Özdikmen, 2010
 Panagrellus Thorne, 1938
 Panagrobelium Andrassy, 1984
 Panagrobelus Thorne
 Panagrodontus Thorne, 1935
 Panagromacra Massey, 1964
 Plectonchus Fuchs, 1930
 Procephalobus Steiner, 1934
 Propanagrolaimus Andrássy, 2005
 Shahnema Siddiqi, 2014
 Tricephalobus Steiner, 1936
 Trilabiatus Goodey, 1963
 Turbatrix Peters, 1927

References

Nematodes